Kurilohadalia brevis is a species of sea snail, a marine gastropod mollusk in the family Pseudomelatomidae, the turrids and allies.

Description

Distribution
This marine species was found in the Kurile-Kamchatka Trench, Northern Pacific

References

 Kantor, Yu I., and A. V. Sysoev. "A new genus and new species from the family Turridae (Gastropoda, Toxoglossa) in the northern part of the Pacific Ocean." Zoologichesky Zhurnal 65.4 (1986): 485-498.

External links
 

brevis
Gastropods described in 1986